Guri i Nikës Resource Reserve is a protected area in southeastern Albania, spanning an area of . It was established in 1996 to protect several ecosystems and biodiversity of national importance. The resource reserve of Guri i Nikës falls inside the Pindus Mountains mixed forests terrestrial ecoregion of the Palearctic Mediterranean forests, woodlands, and scrub biome. A number of different species such as the brown bear and gray wolf, that are fast becoming rare in Southern Europe, reside in the region.

See also  
 Protected areas of Albania
 Geography of Albania
 Biodiversity of Albania

References 

 

Tourist attractions in Albania
Geography of Korçë County
Tourist attractions in Korçë County